William "Bill" Shaw (July 31, 1937 – November 26, 2008) was an American politician. Shaw is noted as the first African-American to serve as mayor of Dolton, Illinois from 1997 until his death in 2008. For many years, Shaw and his twin brother Robert were dominant political "kingmakers" of Chicago's southern suburbs and its far South Side. However, their influence dissipated greatly in the early 2000s.

Biography

Early life and education
Shaw was one of two twin boys born on July 31, 1937, to Gertrude and William McKinley Shaw in Fulton, Arkansas. His parents were sharecroppers who moved to St. Louis, Missouri when he was seven years old. After ten years there, Shaw's family which consisted of six siblings relocated to Chicago, Illinois. For high school, Shaw first attended Vashon High School in St. Louis. At age seventeen, Shaw's family relocated to Chicago, settling on the city's west side. Shaw went on to attended Crane Technical High School; graduating in 1955. After high school, Shaw pursued a short career in boxing.

Career
Shaw first entered in politics as an assistant to Alderman Wilson Frost of Chicago's 34th Ward in 1977. Shaw served as the assistant director of the Illinois Department of Support Services from 1979 until 1982. Shaw was elected to the Illinois House of Representatives in 1982 to the 34th district. He represented the district until 1993. After the 1991 decennial redistricting, Shaw opted to challenge Democratic incumbent Richard F. Kelly for the 15th Senate district. Shaw won the primary by approximately 2,000 votes. During his time in the General Assembly, Shaw pushed for a law that required public schools to teach African-American history. In addition, Shaw also co-sponsored legislation to create the Illinois organ donor program in the secretary of state's office. Shaw served for a decade until losing election to Reverend James T. Meeks in 2003. Shaw was elected mayor of Dolton, Illinois in April 1997, becoming the city's first black mayor. Shaw served five terms as mayor until his death on November 26, 2008. Ronnie Lewis was named by the City Council as interim mayor.

After his loss Senate, Governor George Ryan named Shaw to the position of Small Business Utility Advocate for a term starting March 1, 2003. The position's mandate is to protect and promote the interests of small business utility customers; provide information and assistance regarding utility conservation measures; notify small business community regarding proceedings before state and federal regulatory commissions and courts. The position requires confirmation by the Illinois Senate. Ultimately, in February 2003, Governor Rod Blagojevich chose not to put anyone forward for the position as a cost saving measure.

Personal and death
Shaw was married and had four children. Shaw died of colon cancer at his home in Dolton, Illinois at age 71.

Notes

1937 births
2008 deaths
People from Hempstead County, Arkansas
People from Dolton, Illinois
Politicians from Chicago
Democratic Party members of the Illinois House of Representatives
Democratic Party Illinois state senators
Mayors of places in Illinois
Deaths from cancer in Illinois
American twins
20th-century American politicians
African-American mayors in Illinois